Gary Henderson is an American baseball coach and former pitcher, who is the current head baseball coach of the Utah Utes. He played college baseball at Linfield in 1980 and at San Diego State for head coach Jim Dietz from 1982 to 1984. He was the head coach of the Chapman Panthers (1993), the Kentucky Wildcats (2009–2016) and Mississippi State Bulldogs (2018).

Playing career
Henderson pitched one year at Linfield College before transferring to San Diego State University, compiling a 19-5 career record at the two schools.

Coaching career
Henderson started coaching at his alma mater, San Diego State, as the junior varsity head coach.  He had assistant coaching stints at Cal State Fullerton, Riverside Community College, Chapman College (served as head coach for 1 season), and Pepperdine.

Henderson became an assistant at Florida in 1995. Following a trip to the 1996 College World Series, he was named the National Assistant Coach of the Year by Collegiate Baseball newspaper. With Henderson's assistance, Florida returned to the 1998 College World Series. After a successful stay at Florida, he moved back to the west coast as an assistant coach at Oregon State.

In 2003, he joined John Cohen's staff at Kentucky as the associate head coach. Following the 2008 season, Cohen accepted the head coaching position at his alma mater, Mississippi State, resulting in Henderson's promotion to head coach.

In 2012, Henderson was named Southeastern Conference Coach of the Year.

On June 1, 2016, Henderson resigned as Kentucky Baseball Coach, citing burnout due to the demands of being a head coach in the SEC.

In June 2016, Henderson was named pitching coach at Mississippi State, re-joining John Cohen.

In February 2018, Henderson was named interim head coach at Mississippi State after Andy Cannizaro resigned due to off the field indiscretions. After a poor start, the team turned around and reached the college world series. As a result, Henderson was named the National Collegiate Baseball Writers Coach of the Year. Despite the success of the team, Mississippi State did not retain Henderson as head coach.

On June 20, 2019, Henderson was named the associate head coach at the University of Utah. When Bill Kinneberg resigned as head coach of the Utes, Henderson was elevated to head coach.

Head coaching record

References

Living people
Cal State Fullerton Titans baseball coaches
Chapman Panthers baseball coaches
Florida Gators baseball coaches
Kentucky Wildcats baseball coaches
Linfield Wildcats baseball players
Mississippi State Bulldogs baseball coaches
Oregon State Beavers baseball coaches
Pepperdine Waves baseball coaches
San Diego State Aztecs baseball coaches
San Diego State Aztecs baseball players
Riverside City Tigers baseball coaches
Utah Utes baseball coaches
1961 births